Northcoast Executive Airlines was a regional commuter airline that operated in the Midwestern United States in the early 1990s.  The airline served secondary airports in larger cities with Fairchild SA227 aircraft (from the Fairchild Swearingen Metroliner family).

In late 1990, the airline announced a move from Cleveland's Burke Lakefront to the much larger Cleveland Hopkins International Airport, but later rescinded its decision and returned to Burke.  The conflicting announcements and schedule changes lead to confusion.  The confusion, combined with a weak regional economy, may have hastened the end of the airline.

Northcoast Executive was headed by CEO Calvin Humphrey.  The airline filed for Chapter 7 bankruptcy liquidation on January 29, 1991.

Destinations 
Northcoast Executive serviced:

 Illinois
 Chicago (Midway Airport)
 Michigan
 Detroit City Airport (since renamed Coleman A. Young International Airport)
 Flint (Bishop International Airport) 
 Ohio
 Cleveland
 Cleveland Burke Lakefront Airport
 Cleveland Hopkins International Airport (briefly)
  Dayton General Airport (since renamed Dayton-Wright Brothers Airport)

Fleet 
 Fairchild SA227-AC Metro III

See also
 List of defunct airlines of the United States

References

External links
 Image of a Northcoast Executive Fairchild SA227-AC Metro III in Flint, MI
 Image of a Northcoast Executive Fairchild SA227-AC Metro III in Dayton, OH
 Image of a Northcoast Executive Airlines Schedule

Airlines established in 1990
Airlines disestablished in 1991
Defunct airlines of the United States
Defunct regional airlines of the United States
Companies that have filed for Chapter 7 bankruptcy